The Lianyungang–Khorgas Expressway, designated as G30 and commonly referred to as the Lianhuo Expressway, is  in China that connects the cities of Lianyungang, in the province of Jiangsu, and Khorgas, in the autonomous region of Xinjiang, on the border with Kazakhstan. At Khorgas, there is a border crossing into Kazakhstan. The expressway is the longest contiguous expressway in China with a single numeric designation, stretching across the country from the Yellow Sea on the east coast to the Kazakhstan border in the west. It passes through the provinces of Jiangsu, Anhui, Henan, Shaanxi, Gansu, and Xinjiang.

Part of the Expressway passes through the historically significant Hexi Corridor in Gansu and Xinjiang.

Route
The expressway passes through the following cities:
Lianyungang, Jiangsu
Xuzhou, Jiangsu
Shangqiu, Henan
Kaifeng, Henan
Zhengzhou, Henan
Luoyang, Henan
Sanmenxia, Henan
Weinan, Shaanxi
Xi'an, Shaanxi
Baoji, Shaanxi
Tianshui, Gansu
Lanzhou, Gansu
Wuwei, Gansu
Zhangye, Gansu
Jiuquan, Gansu
Hami, Xinjiang
Turpan, Xinjiang
Ürümqi, Xinjiang
Changji, Xinjiang
Shihezi, Xinjiang
Khorgas, Xinjiang

Accidents
On February 1, 2013, a truck carrying fireworks exploded on the Yichang Bridge, which carries the Lianyungang–Khorgas Expressway, in Mianchi County, Sanmenxia, Henan, causing an 80 m section of bridge to collapse. 13 people died in the accident and 9 were injured.

Exit list

References

Videos

Chinese national-level expressways
Expressways in Jiangsu
Expressways in Anhui
Expressways in Henan
Expressways in Shaanxi
Expressways in Gansu
Expressways in Xinjiang